Albite is a plagioclase feldspar mineral. It is the sodium endmember of the plagioclase solid solution series. It represents a plagioclase with less than 10% anorthite content. The pure albite endmember has the formula . It is a tectosilicate. Its color is usually pure white, hence its name from Latin, . It is a common constituent in felsic rocks.

Properties 
Albite crystallizes with triclinic pinacoidal forms. Its specific gravity is about 2.62 and it has a Mohs hardness of 6–6.5. Albite almost always exhibits crystal twinning often as minute parallel striations on the crystal face. Albite often occurs as fine parallel segregations alternating with pink microcline in perthite as a result of exolution on cooling.

There are two variants of albite, which are referred to as 'low albite' and 'high albite'; the latter is also known as 'analbite'. Although both variants are triclinic, they differ in the volume of their unit cell, which is slightly larger for the 'high' form. The 'high' form can be produced from the 'low' form by heating above  High albite can be found in meteor impact craters such as in Winslow, Coconino Co., Arizona, United States. Upon further heating to more than  the crystal symmetry changes from triclinic to monoclinic; this variant is also known as 'monalbite'.

Oftentimes, potassium can replace the sodium characteristic in albite at amounts of up to 10%. When this is exceeded the mineral is then considered to be anorthoclase.

Occurrence 

It occurs in granitic and pegmatite masses (often as the variety cleavelandite), in some hydrothermal vein deposits, and forms part of the typical greenschist metamorphic facies for rocks of originally basaltic composition. Minerals that albite is often considered associated with in occurrence include biotite, hornblende, orthoclase, muscovite and quartz.

Discovery 
Albite was first reported in 1815 for an occurrence in Finnbo, Falun, Dalarna, Sweden.

Use 
Albite is used as a gemstone, albeit semi-precious. Albite is also used by geologists as it is identified as an important rock forming mineral. There is some industrial use for the mineral such as the manufacture of glass and ceramics.

References

External links

 Mineral galleries

Tectosilicates
Feldspar
Triclinic minerals
Luminescent minerals
Gemstones
Minerals in space group 2